Salado High School is a public high school located in Salado, Texas (USA) and classified as a 4A school by the UIL. It is part of the Salado Independent School District located in southern Bell County. In 2015, the school was rated "Met Standard" by the Texas Education Agency.

Academics
UIL Academic Meet Champions - 
1995(2A), 2000(2A), 2001(2A), 2002(2A), 2003(2A), 2005(2A), 2007(2A), 2013(2A), 2014(2A)

Athletics

The Salado Eagles compete in these sports - 

Baseball
Basketball
Cross Country
Football
Golf
Powerlifting
Soccer
Softball
Tennis
Track and Field
Volleyball
Swimming
Wrestling

State Titles
Baseball 
2008(2A)
Boys Golf 
1973(B), 1981(1A), 1982(1A), 1983(1A), 1984(1A), 1986(1A), 2008(2A), 2009(2A), 2014 (2A)
Girls Golf 
1982(1A), 2002(2A), 2003(2A), 2006(2A), 2010(2A), 2013(2A)

Track - Sprint relay 2010(3A)

Texas Lone Star Cup 
2008(2A), 2013(2A), 2014(2A)

References

External links
 Salado ISD

High schools in Bell County, Texas
Public high schools in Texas